"Love Is All..." is a song by the Danish dance-pop duo Infernal. It was announced to be the lead single off their forthcoming fifth studio album, Fall from Grace, on 4 April 2010 in a blog post by Paw Lagermann in Infernal's website.
The song was released as a digital download on 10 May 2010 and debuted at #6 on the Danish Singles Chart on 22 May 2010. It has since been certified gold by the International Federation of the Phonographic Industry (IFPI) for sales of 15,000 units. On 27 April 2012, Infernal released a new version of "Love Is All..." for the international market.

The music video was directed by Jakob Øllgaard and produced by Klaus Christensen for M2FILM.

Track listing

Charts and certifications

Charts

Certifications

Release history

References

External links
 
 Love Is All... at Infernal.dk
 Love Is All... at iTunes Store

2010 singles
Infernal (Danish band) songs
Songs written by Adam Powers
Songs written by Paw Lagermann
Songs written by Lina Rafn
2009 songs